De Paul Institute of Science & Technology (DIST), in Angamaly, Kerala, India, is a college run by the Vincentian Congregation (Marymatha Province).

References

External links
 

Catholic universities and colleges in India
Universities and colleges in Ernakulam district